The Lammermuir Party was a British group of Protestant missionaries who travelled to China in 1866 aboard the tea clipper Lammermuir, accompanied by James Hudson Taylor, the founder of the China Inland Mission. Mission historians have indicated that this event was a turning point in the history of missionary work in China in the 19th century. This was the largest party of Protestant missionaries to date to arrive at one time on Chinese shores. It was also noteworthy that none of the members of the mission were ordained ministers, and only two had any previous overseas experience. In addition to this, there were among them nine unmarried women traveling to a place where single European women were rare for many reasons.

Departure

On the morning of 26 May 1866, the 34 sailors, 18 missionaries and four children boarded the Lammermuir, which lay tied up at London's East India Docks. Lammermuir was a two-year-old clipper ship with three masts and square-rigged sails. Grace Stott was to have sailed but she was left behind for medical reasons. The ship's frame was built of iron, and she was a first-class sailing vessel. A voyage halfway around the world would only take four months; a fast trip compared to the six-month duration of some of the older ships of the previous decade.

Henry Grattan Guinness wrote a hymn in honor of their departure that echoed Hudson Taylor's 1865 book China's Spiritual Need and Claims:

Two typhoons

The Lammermuir was nearly wrecked by two typhoons before limping into the Shanghai harbour in late September.

Hudson Taylor, the missionary, recalled the most perilous time in the voyage:

Taylor wrote after twelve days of this experience:

The badly damaged ship caused a local stir in Shanghai. Emily Blatchley noted:
 Even more so, the intent of the passengers to wear native Chinese clothes and embark into the interior of China with single women among them caused a greater consternation among the “Westerners” in port settlement. This led to the agency being referred to by some Westerners as "The Pigtail Mission".

List of missionaries and children

 James Hudson Taylor
 Mrs. Maria Jane Taylor (Maria Jane Dyer) (died of cholera 4 years later - 1870)
 Grace Dyer Taylor (died of meningitis in the first year - 1867)
 Herbert Hudson Taylor 1861-1950
 Frederick Howard Taylor 1862-1946
 Samuel Dyer Taylor (died less than 4 years later of tuberculosis in 1870)
 Lewis Nicol, Arbroath, Aberdeen, blacksmith. 1867 Xiaoshan outrage, sent back to England. 1868 dismissed from C.I.M.
 Mrs. Eliza Calder Nicol, Aberdeen, wife of Lewis Nicol.
 George Duncan, Banff, Scotland, stonemason. Assigned to Nanking & Tsing-kiangpu (traditional spelling). m. Catherine, 1868 in Shanghai. d.1873 in England.
 Josiah Alexander Jackson, Kingsland, carpenter/draper. Assigned to Taizchou and Wenzchou. m. Francis Wilson (also a C.I.M. missionary) in 1872. They had a daughter Emily. Franny died 1878. Jackson returned to England for the first time in 14 years. rem. Francis Hine in 1881. She died in China 1882. Jackson left CIM 1884. Returned to Shanghai as a Hotel Proprietor. rem. Sarah Gatrell in 1898. He died in Shanghai, China in 1909.
 William David Rudland, Little Eversden, Blacksmith. Evangelist. Supervised printing press. Translated New Testament and most of the Old testament to the Romanized Taizchou dialect. Last surviving adult member of the Lammermuir Party. d. 1912 in China. Daughter Grace joined C.I.M. 1895 in China.
 John Robert Sell, Romford (died of smallpox in the first year - 1867)
 James Williamson, Arbroath, carpenter. married his sweetheart 1873 in Scotland. d. Nov.1896 in Scotland. His daughter Mary joined C.I.M. in 1896 in China.
 Susan Barnes, Limerick, Resigned from C.I.M. to join London Missionary Society, 1868.
 Mary Elizabeth Bausum, Walthamstow, step-sister of Maria Taylor, on her way to join their mother, Mrs. Lord in Ningpo. m. Dr. Stephen Barchett in 1868.
 Emily Blatchley, London, Secretary to Hudson Taylor, Editor of the Occasional Papers, and governess for the Taylor children. d. July 1874 in London from tuberculosis.
 Mary Bell, [Great Waltham, Essex], Governess for the Taylor children on board ship and in China. m. William D. Rudland, 25 December 1867. Her work with women in the Taizhou district opened doors to the district expansion. She d. 23 October 1874 in London from Remittant Fever.
 Mary Bowyer, Mildmay-London, worked at school in Hangzchou. m.F.W. Baller, 1875.d. 1909
 Louise Desgraz, Liverpool & Switzerland, Started a children's home in Hangzchou. She adopted several abandoned children using her own funds. m. Edward Tomalin, 1878. She directed the Chefoo school.  d. 1907 in China.
 Jane Elizabeth Faulding, London. Started a school near Hangzchou. m. Hudson Taylor 1871. First western woman to enter inland China. d.1904 in Switzerland.
 Jane McLean, Inverness. Known as the "bible woman". engaged to John Sell in 1867. After his death she resigned C.I.M. in 1868 to join London Missionary Society in Shanghai.
 Elisabeth Rose, Barnsley, joined the group to marry James Meadows. m.1866. She d. 1890. Daughters Louise joined C.I.M. in 1893 and Minnie joined C.I.M. in 1895.

Chronology of voyage
 26 May 1866: Depart East India Docks, London
 Last sight of England is Start Point lighthouse, Devon
 3 June: near Cape Finisterre
 12 June: near Canary Islands
 18 June: near Cape Verde Islands
 June Atlantic Ocean doldrums
 c. 7 July: near Trinidad Island
 pass The Great Tea Race of 1866 Fiery Cross, Taeping, Ariel, Serica, and Taitsing (later 3 others) bound for London
 pass Belted Will, Flying Spur bound for London
 sight Cape Town lighthouse
 pass the Min and Falcon bound for London
 conversion of many of crew to Christianity
 3 August: early morning Taylor wakes several to tell of First Mate Brunton's conversion
 4 August: heavy seas–sternsail boom breaks and hits William Carron. Jennie Faulding talks with Grace Taylor and it is evident that she has had a Christian conversion experience
 c. 14 August: near Amsterdam Island
 sight flying fish in Indian Ocean
 27 August: Sunda Strait past Mt. Krakatoa
 28 August: Anjer Roads, Java: shore leave & baptism service
 31 August: Selat Gelasa (Gaspar Strait), past wrecks of other ships including the first Lammermuir, wrecked in 1863
 1 September: South China Sea cross Equator
 10 September–14 September: first typhoon in the East China Sea
 14 September–19 September: stormy detour around Taiwan
 18 September: near Fujian coast
 20 September–24 September: second typhoon in Pacific Ocean nearly wrecks the ship
 21 September: bulwarks gone
 22 September: all three topmasts gone
 23 September: Hudson Taylor kisses children and then goes out in storm to help crew
 28 September: near Ma-an Liedao (Saddle Islands)
 29 September: The Lammermuir arrives near Wusong, China
 30 September 1866: arrives Shanghai

References

Notes

External links
OMF International (formerly China Inland Mission and Overseas Missionary Fellowship)
Christian Biography Resources
http://www.missionaryetexts.org/
https://web.archive.org/web/20070926212919/http://www.genealogy.com/users/y/o/r/Brian-York-Burnsville/?Welcome=1091209026

Further reading
Historical Bibliography of the China Inland Mission
"Hudson Taylor's Spiritual Secret" by Geraldine Taylor, Ed. Gwen Hanna 2007

Lammermuir Party
Lammermuir Party
Lammermuir Party
Lammermuir Party
Lammermuir Party
Lammermuir Party